The Georgia Southern and Florida Railway , also known as the Suwanee River Route from its crossing of the Suwanee River, was founded in 1885 as the Georgia Southern and Florida Railroad and began operations between Macon, GA and Valdosta, GA in 1889, extending to Palatka, FL in 1890.  The railroad went bankrupt by 1891, was reorganized as the Georgia Southern and Florida Railway in 1895, and was controlled by the Southern Railway.  

In 1902, the GS&F purchased the Atlantic, Valdosta and Western Railway that ran from Valdosta, GA to Jacksonville, FL.  The GS&F also owned the Macon and Birmingham Railway and the Hawkinsville and Florida Southern Railway, both of which were operated as separate companies; both ended up going bankrupt and being mostly abandoned.  The GS&F was eventually acquired by the Norfolk Southern Railway and still operates as a subsidiary. As of November 2012, at least one operating Norfolk Southern locomotive retains GSF reporting marks.

The line was abandoned south of Lake City, Florida in the late 1980s.  The Palatka-Lake Butler State Trail runs along some of the abandoned right of way.  The remaining line is still in service and operated by Norfolk Southern Railway.  It is designated as Norfolk Southern's Macon District from Macon to Valdosta, and the Navair District from Valdosta to end of the line in Navair (just south of Lake City).

Historic stations

See also
Palatka-Lake Butler State Trail

References

External links

 "Georgia Southern & Florida Railroad," Railga.com
 Abandoned Florida segment, described by Abandoned Rails

Georgia (U.S. state) railroads
Defunct Florida railroads
Railway companies established in 1895
Predecessors of the Southern Railway (U.S.)
Norfolk Southern Railway
Former Class I railroads in the United States
American companies established in 1895